The Bishop of Berwick is an episcopal title used by the suffragan bishop of the Church of England Diocese of Newcastle in the Province of York, England.

The title was originally created in 1537 in the Diocese of Durham, and takes its name from the town of Berwick-upon-Tweed in Northumberland. After the death of the only bishop in 1572, the title went into abeyance.

From 1980 until 2016, the Assistant Bishop of Newcastle was an episcopal title used by the sole stipendiary assistant bishop (effectively suffragan bishop) of the Diocese of Newcastle. The title took its name as the bishop who assists the diocesan Bishop of Newcastle.

On 28 November 2015, Frank White, Assistant Bishop of Newcastle (at the end of a vacancy in the See of Newcastle), presented a proposal to the Diocesan Synod of the Diocese of Newcastle (within which diocese Berwick now lies) to revive the abeyant Suffragan See of Berwick. The Dioceses Commission approved the petition to revive the See, the post was advertised in April 2016, and the appointment of Mark Tanner, Warden of Cranmer Hall, Durham, (part of St John's College, Durham) was announced on 1 September 2016; Tanner was translated to Chester on 15 July 2020.

On 20 October 2020, it was announced that the nomination of Mark Wroe, Archdeacon of Northumberland, as the third Bishop of Berwick had been approved by the Queen. He was consecrated at York Minster on 5 January 2021, with the service livestreamed due to strict restrictions on attendance because of the COVID-19 pandemic .

List of bishops

Other assistant bishops

References

External links
 Crockford's Clerical Directory - Listings
 Announcement of the appointment of Mark Tanner

Anglican suffragan bishops in the Diocese of Durham